Saad Ashraf (born 25 September 1997) is an English cricketer. In 2017, he was named the Young Player of the Year in the Nottinghamshire Premier League. He made his first-class debut on 26 March 2019, for Leeds/Bradford MCCU against Derbyshire, as part of the Marylebone Cricket Club University fixtures.

References

External links
 

1997 births
Living people
English cricketers
Leeds/Bradford MCCU cricketers
British Asian cricketers